Ramon Hendriks (born 18 July 2001) is a Dutch professional footballer who plays as a defender for Eredivisie club Utrecht on loan from Feyenoord.

Club career
Born in Hendrik-Ido-Ambacht, Hendriks played youth football for ASWH before joining Feyenoord in 2017. In January 2021, he joined NAC Breda on loan until the end of the season, where he made 19 appearances. He made his Eredivisie debut for Feyenoord on 15 August 2021 as a substitute in a 4–0 win over Willem II.

On 8 June 2022, Hendricks was loaned to Utrecht for the season, with an option to buy.

International career
Hendriks has represented the Netherlands at under-17, under-18 and under-19 international levels. He made 5 appearances as the Netherlands won the 2018 UEFA European Under-17 Championship.

Career statistics

Honours
Feyenoord
 UEFA Europa Conference League runner-up: 2021–22

Netherlands U17
 UEFA European Under-17 Championship: 2018

References

External links

2001 births
Living people
Dutch footballers
Footballers from Hendrik-Ido-Ambacht
Association football defenders
ASWH players
Feyenoord players
NAC Breda players
FC Utrecht players
Eredivisie players
Eerste Divisie players
Netherlands youth international footballers